Manohar Untwal (19 July 1966 – 30 January 2020) was an Indian politician from the state of Madhya Pradesh, belonging to Bharatiya Janata Party. He was elected to MP's Vidhan Sabha in 2013 from Agar (Vidhan Sabha constituency). He vacated the seat after winning the 2014 Indian general elections from the Dewas (Lok Sabha constituency). In 2018 he was again elected to Vidhan Sabha from Agar. He suffered brain haemorrhage and died in January 2020 due to a stroke.

References

1966 births
2020 deaths
India MPs 2014–2019
People from Dewas
People from Dewas district
Lok Sabha members from Madhya Pradesh
Bharatiya Janata Party politicians from Madhya Pradesh
Vikram University alumni